Knockbreda is a civil parish in County Down, Northern Ireland. It is situated mainly in the historic barony of Castlereagh Upper, with 4 townlands in the barony of Castlereagh Lower.

Settlements
The civil parish contains a number of areas now in Belfast:
Ballymacarrett
Braniel
Cregagh
Newtownbreda

Townlands
The civil parish contains the following townlands:

Ballydollaghan
Ballylenaghan
Ballymacarrett
Ballymaconaghy
Ballynafoy
Ballyrushboy
Braniel
Breda
Carnamuck
Castlereagh
Cregagh
Galywally
Gilnahirk
Gortgrib
Knock
Knockbreckan
Lisnabreeny
Lisnasharragh
Multyhogy
Slatady
Tullycarnet

See also
List of civil parishes of County Down

References